Peter Agostini (February 13, 1913 Hell's Kitchen, Manhattan – March 27, 1993) was an American sculptor.

Life
Agostini studied at the Leonardo da Vinci Art School in 1935 and 1936. He taught sculpture and painting at the New York Studio School, Columbia University, the University of North Carolina at Greensboro, and the Parsons School of Design.

His works are in the Metropolitan Museum of Art, the Whitney Museum of American Art, the Museum of Modern Art, the Solomon R. Guggenheim Museum, the Hirshhorn Museum and Sculpture Garden and the Walker Art Center. His work has been exhibited in a number of galleries, including the Anita Shapolsky Gallery, Olaf Clasen Gallery, and Salander O’Reilly Galleries, in New York City.

Watercolorist Ellen Murray studied with Agostini.

Peter Agostini is the father of actress Diana Agostini (The Godfather: Part III (1990), The Irishman (2019)).

References

External links
"Oral history interview with Peter Agostini, 1968", Archives of American Art
"Peter Agostini", The Artist Profiles Project, January 31, 2010
http://www.artnet.com/artists/peter-agostini/past-auction-results
https://web.archive.org/web/20110707144735/http://www.anitashapolskygallery.com/agostini.html
http://artcritical.com/2006/06/01/peter-agostini/

1913 births
People from Hell's Kitchen, Manhattan
1993 deaths
Artists from New York City
Columbia University faculty
University of North Carolina at Greensboro faculty
Parsons School of Design faculty
20th-century American sculptors
20th-century American male artists
American male sculptors
Sculptors from New York (state)